Luann is a syndicated newspaper comic strip written and drawn by Greg Evans and launched by North America Syndicate on March 17, 1985. The strip is currently syndicated by Andrews McMeel Syndication. In 2012, Greg Evans' daughter Karen Evans began co-authoring the strip.

Luann takes place in an unnamed suburban setting, and primarily focuses on young adult Luann DeGroot dealing with school, her love interests, family, and friends. Some storylines center on other characters, including her older brother Brad. The strip is particularly notable in that the characters age over time, albeit not in real time.

In 2003, Evans won the Reuben Award for Cartoonist of the Year for his work on Luann.

Characters and story

Main characters
Luann C. DeGroot The comic strip's titular protagonist. Luann often suffers from a poor self-assessment of her popularity and attractiveness, especially of her large feet. She can also be shallow, self-centered, and very immature. Luann attended Pitts Junior–Senior High School until her graduation in 2014. Having starred in West Side Story and becoming a runner-up in a beauty pageant, Luann plans on becoming an entertainer.  She is consistently portrayed as left-handed, not an uncommon feature for a comic strip character. She now attends the local junior college where she takes introductory art and chemistry classes. She, along with Tiffany, continues her summer job in early education. :: First appearance: March 17, 1985

Bernice Halper One of Luann's best friends since meeting when they were both in third grade. Bernice is laid-back and observant, but also a pessimist, claiming to find everything in life impossible (except for getting straight A's, according to Luann). In January 2007, Bernice learned she had an older brother, Army Sgt. Ben York, who was deployed in Iraq. Her parents had placed him for adoption, as they felt they were too young to have a child. Bernice initially planned to become a veterinarian but spent her senior year as an intern guidance counselor. In 2014, she began college at Moony University, moved into the dormitory, and became friends with her roommate Dez. In 2015, she became an R.A. in her dorm, but by 2020 her position has been scrapped and she has had to move in with the DeGroot family.

First appearance: March 18, 1985

Delta James One of Luann's best friends. In the early years of the strip, Delta was something of a slacker, but became more of a go-getter as she got older, attending dozens of clubs and activities every school year as well as volunteering. While Bernice is intellectually wise, Delta is the more politically intelligent, and plans a career in politics. In 1998, Delta was diagnosed with Hodgkin lymphoma, which went into remission under treatment the following year. In January 2009, Delta was nearly prevented from participating in a class trip to Washington, D.C., due to lack of funds, but was finally able to go by means of donations raised by Luann and Bernice, with the help of Tiffany Farrell and Elwood Druit. During the visit, Delta met the newly inaugurated President Barack Obama while looking for a restroom in the White House, after which "her White House contact" became a running joke. Delta is now attending Howard University in Washington, and has rarely been mentioned since her last appearance in 2014.

First appearance: April 1, 1985
Last appearance: November 11, 2014

Nancy and Frank DeGroot Luann's parents. Nancy is portrayed as the heart of the family, while Frank provides for it, though he's usually portrayed as criminally cheap. Frank often seems clueless about what goes on, while Nancy is more aware. She constantly hounds Luann to clean her room, without success. Using their savings and money from T.J.'s insurance settlement, Frank and Nancy have purchased a rundown warehouse, and turned it into a restaurant and performance space.

Frank's first appearance: March 21, 1985 (voice), May 22, 1985 (drawn).

Nancy's first appearance: May 3, 1985 (voice), August 12, 1986 (drawn).

Brad DeGroot Luann's older brother, to whom she usually shows a snarky sibling attitude, and vice versa. Brad began his working life at Weenie World, a hot dog and hamburger restaurant similar to Wienerschnitzel, but following 9/11, he was inspired to become a firefighter. Brad had previously been a couch potato, but had to become more physically fit to qualify as a firefighter, and has since been drawn with a more fit physique and well-defined jawline. Brad and his best friend, T.J., then moved into a rental home owned by Brad's parents. Their house was later damaged by T.J. after he neglected a frying pan on the stove, and it was later remodeled. In his spare time, Brad is shown fixing his dilapidated car. When he became a firefighter, Brad's storylines shared equal, if not more, time than Luann's storylines.

 In June 2011 Brad was laid off due to budget cuts, but after another firefighter left, he was rehired in November. On March 31, 2012, Brad proposed to Toni Daytona, with some persuasion from T.J., but they agreed to postpone the topic. One year later, on April 2, 2013, Toni proposed to Brad, and he tearfully accepted. Originally, as an homage to their meeting at the firehouse and 9/11 being the impetus for Brad pursuing a firefighting career, Brad and Toni were planning to make September 11 their wedding date. The idea generated real-life controversy against the strip, so the wedding was postponed to December 11, 2016, on which they had a small ceremony in the firehouse. Following the wedding, Toni moved into the house shared by T.J. and Brad.

Brad's first appearance: March 25, 1985 (voice), March 26, 1985 (drawn).

Love interests
Aaron Hill The boy of both Luann's and Tiffany's dreams.  He has been seen to be vain, therefore a natural match with Tiffany (whom he has dated), yet is sometimes considerate of others' feelings. To Luann, he is cute and lovable, but mixed up, having once been in love with Diane, who was a few years too old for him. He now lives in Hawaii. In August 2005, Luann won a free trip to Hawaii and visited Aaron, but was confronted about his new girlfriend, Lian. He later set up his own MySpace page, and had sent a message to Luann in October 2006 talking about what he'd done in Hawaii, including breaking up with Lian, sparking another love craze for Aaron in Luann. While the possibility was teased for a few weeks, he ultimately did not reappear and has not been seen since Luann's Hawaii trip.

First mentioned: March 23, 1985.

First appearance March 24, 1985.

Last appearance: August 15, 2005, April 1, 2020 (flashback cameo)

Gunther Berger Pitts High School's smartest student with poor personal fashion sense and gentlemanly qualities. To Luann, he was sweet and sincere, but not her romantic ideal. Gunther was constantly jealous of Luann's crushes on other guys, since she's the one girl he'd loved his entire life. While Luann was not interested in him herself, she still became jealous when Gunther displayed interest in other girls. He had an on-again-off-again romantic interest in Luann at times and at others in Bernice, with whom he has more in common. He has worn contact lenses although he's allergic to them. He joined Luann in volunteering to read to children at the local library, and showed an unexpected skill at sewing, making elaborate costumes based on the story Luann planned to read. Gunther lived with his mother. He has a good deal of insecurity about his father deserting the family when Gunther was young, and worries that it was because of him. Luann expressed ambivalence about Gunther, but to be a caring and genuine friend, volunteered to help him maintain his home when his mother broke her leg.

In strips from late 2012–2014, Gunther and Rosa Aragones showed mutual feelings for each other. However, Gunther appeared nervous with Rosa, and was often tongue-tied when approached by her. Luann was supportive of Gunther, and offered him advice on how to win Rosa's heart. After graduation, he went with Rosa to Peru, but after some time became disillusioned; with Rosa giving him supporting advice to make his own decisions, Gunther returned home to attend college (having matured somewhat in the process). After becoming study buddies with Tiffany, Gunther became conflicted about their status, with possible hints that Tiffany is now attracted to him. Leslie Knox, who bullied Gunther in high school, became a grudging acquaintance when Leslie's uncle, Al Gray, started dating Gunther's mother Irma. Mr. Gray proposed to Mrs. Berger shortly before Christmas 2017, much to Gunther's dismay.

First mentioned: March 23, 1985

First appearance: November 29, 1987

Quill A Pitts High School senior who moved with his family from Australia. His father is a chemist attending a US study program. Quill's arrival fanned Luann's ongoing rivalry with Tiffany: Tiffany was openly attracted to Quill, while Quill did not return the attention and showed more interest in Luann due to their shared interests, specifically music, and the fact that she's smarter than Tiffany. They had their first kiss at a New Year's Eve Party welcoming in 2011. Luann and Quill confessed a mutual attraction but decided not to pursue a relationship, since Quill would have to return to Australia. Despite this plan, they soon considered ways to break the non-dating agreement. They eventually kissed romantically in Luann's room – when her parents weren't home – but immediately afterwards Quill received a call from his father, informing him that the family was moving back to Australia that week. In 2013, he maintained a long-distance relationship with Luann. In 2014, he returned to the States and graduated with Luann's class. He went on to attend college and became roommates with Gunther after Gunther returned from Peru. When Quill began prioritizing his acting career over Luann, who was struggling to spend time with him and left on the sidelines, she decided their relationship wasn't working, and broke up with him in the February 17th, 2016 strip, coolly accepting his sarcastic suggestion that she get a life. After a follow-up appearance a few months later, confirming he had moved on with his life, he disappeared from the strip entirely. Like Luann, Quill is left-handed.

First appearance: June 22, 2009

Last appearance: September 28, 2016, April 1, 2020 (flashback cameo)

Toni Louise Daytona Brad's wife and fellow firefighter. She joined Brad in all of the Pre-Fire Academy courses, including the CPR and first aid, EMT, and paramedic classes, until Brad failed the physical exam the first time, and had to go on to the next one alone. Her boyfriend, Dirk, had grown jealous of Brad and Toni's friendship and became emotionally abusive to Toni and physically violent with Brad, which led to her eventually dumping Dirk. After he was released from jail, they began socializing again, but after Brad had Dirk arrested for violating his restraining order too many times, Toni blamed Brad and they stopped speaking for months. However, after Brad moved into his rental home, Toni began to visit Brad on occasion.  Their relationship moved slowly forward, including dates, and they first kissed on April 2, 2008.

In a mid-2009 storyline, Toni, while putting out a fire at a residential house, was climbing a ladder that was wet from the fire hoses, slipped, fell and was caught by Brad. In so doing, Brad seriously injured himself and was hospitalized. In thanks, Toni offered to stay by his side and look after him as much as needed until he recovered. During his recovery period, Toni professed her love for Brad. In a recent 2010 holiday strip, Toni and Brad went shopping, during which she had him hold her purse while she bought lingerie, even asking his favorite color (blue), showing that their relationship was heading to the next level.

In June 2010, it was established that her parents died in a car crash, and she and her brother were brought up by their aunt and uncle. Neither of the Daytona children took their parents' death well; her brother Jonah's girlfriend became pregnant with his daughter, Shannon, and took off soon after her birth. Toni, Jonah, and Shannon came to Pitts about 4 years ago.

 On March 31, 2012, Brad proposed to Toni.  On April 2, 2013, Toni proposed to Brad. Unlike Brad's previous proposal, this appeared to be a serious proposal. Brad accepted the next day. Their wedding was on December 11, 2016.

First appearance: January 18, 2002

Diane Brad's first love interest.  Brad was smitten by her, very confused by her motives and character, and often tried to impress her with shallow gimmicks, but to no avail. A running gag in the strip was that almost every time she greeted Brad, when he was working on his car, she startled him and caused him to hit his head on the hood above him. She and Aaron Hill had a brief relationship, then realized they were too different and too far apart in age. They ended it with a kiss, which was seen by an outraged Brad and Luann. Before she left town, Diane discovered that she and Brad had very little in common, especially when it comes to Brad's passion for cars.

First mentioned: July 10, 1989

First appearance: July 30, 1989

Last appearance: February 13, 1999, although she appeared in the background at Brad and Toni's wedding: December 11, 2016

Miguel Vargas Foreign exchange student from Spain. When he was introduced, a thief tried to steal Delta's purse, but Miguel tripped him as he attempted to escape, immediately winning her affections. When he began his first day at school, Luann, Delta, and Tiffany all competed for Miguel. Although Miguel liked all three, he was most attracted to Luann, finding her "plain, ordinary" personality much more interesting. When Delta contracted cancer, Miguel was attentively by her side during her hospital stay, which prompted Luann's jealousy. Luann found Miguel to be very handsome, but too aggressive, which led to on-and-off romantic sparring between them. In a sequence beginning on November 29, 1999, Miguel drove Luann to a secluded parking spot for their date. Luann's phone rang, and she faked a family emergency to get out of the situation. He once saved Tiffany's life by performing CPR after she almost drowned in the pool. She showered him with attention, then used him to steal Gunther's test paper so she could copy the answers. She got caught and charmed Miguel into taking the blame, claiming he stole it on his own to give to her. Rather than inform on her, Miguel took the blame and chose to return to Spain.

First appearance: August 25, 1998

Last appearance: March 14, 2001, April 1, 2020 (flashback cameo)

Stuart Lifeguard at the Pitts Public Pool. He once saved both Luann and Tiffany from drowning in the pool, after a panicking Tiffany almost drowned Luann, who attempted to rescue her. Although he was 21, Stuart became Luann's new romantic obsession, even to the point of her talking to her parents about dating an older man. When she took him to dinner to thank him for saving her life, she truly believed Stuart was the one for her, until Stuart mentioned his wife, Stacey. This crushed Luann's hopes, and she left him sitting at the restaurant.

First appearance: July 4, 2000

Last appearance: June 16, 2001, April 1, 2020 (flashback cameo)

Zane Former boyfriend of Bernice and owner of Monroe. Zane became paralyzed from the waist down when he was driving with his parents to a college he was going to attend.  A truck collided with their car head on: his parents were killed instantly, Zane was thrown from the car, breaking his spine and legs. It took him a year to fully rehabilitate. He was once saved by Brad in a fire at Borderline Books, where he and Bernice worked. Bernice was wildly in love with him and extremely jealous of any rival's attentions, such as Crystal or Ann Eiffel, their mutual boss, to the point of fantasizing leaving school to marry him. After surviving two near-death experiences, Zane realized he needed to deal with neglected past issues, including his relationship with his sister. Bernice respected his decision, yet a fear of losing him prompted her to propose marriage; Zane told her to wait until they were older. Crystal was attracted to Zane when she introduced him to her wheelchair-bound little brother, Josh [2003]. In spite of Bernice's extreme jealousy, Zane seemed to only consider Crystal as a friend. Bernice dumped Zane when she got new glasses and Zane failed to notice the change, as she felt this was indicative of a larger feeling of disinterest on his part.

First appearance: June 27, 2001

Last appearance: August 27, 2004

Elwood Druit The "Elvis Jr." of Pitts High School, and a multi-millionaire due to his Eyez of Zeye video game franchise. He is half Luann's height, and very arrogant and blunt. He once accepted Luann's offer to take him to the Spring 2005 Dance, then cancelled because he 'was asked by someone better'. When he changed his mind and went back to Luann to accept her original offer, she turned him down. He dated Tiffany for a time, her interest in him is presumably because he is a multi-millionaire. In January 2009, he offered to pay for Delta's ticket for the class trip to Washington D.C., in exchange for Luann's going on a date with him. Luann reluctantly agreed, they went to a fancy restaurant which he claimed he owned.  He has made subsequent passes at Luann, visiting her at the library where she works.  He has also donated money to keep the library going, which has prompted Gunther's jealousy. Bernice believes him to be a fraud, since she can find no mention of him or his multi-millionaire status on the internet. In September 2009, Elwood proposed to Luann; she eventually returned the ring, but not before it was revealed to be cubic zirconia worth $49. Elwood claimed it was a $15,000 ring which he got from a friend who "deals in jewelry", and that he would get his money back. Elwood never appeared again.

First appearance: March 25, 2005

Last appearance: October 10, 2009

Ben York Bernice's older brother, who appeared in the strip as an army sergeant on leave from duty from the Middle East. Bernice's parents had him in college before they married and decided to give him up for adoption. His adoptive family named him Ben York. He briefly returned to his birth family after searching for them on his computer. During the month of his first appearance, the DeGroot and Halper siblings went bowling together. While Brad initially felt jealous and insecure about Ben in comparison to his being a soldier, he soon felt better after Ben mentioned that he tried to become a firefighter, but washed out after one week of academy training, and that he had nothing but respect for firefighters and considered them to be real heroes. Luann, naturally, developed a crush on Ben. Although after finding out from Bernice that Ben was supposedly not interested in a girlfriend, Luann became more attracted to him after he e-mailed Bernice and asked for Luann's email. Luann, full of romantic glee, exchanged twelve emails with Ben in just three days, annoying Bernice to the point that she demanded that their contact cease.

While on a mission in Iraq, Ben suffered a broken leg, allowing him to discontinue his service in the army and return home. Though Luann assured Bernice that she no longer saw Ben as a potential romance, she rekindled her interest by making a Valentine's Day dinner for Ben. Bernice showed no objection to Luann's plan, but this was due to the fact that she knew Ben would be out of town the night Luann was planning dinner.  Luann was disappointed, and somewhat annoyed at Bernice for not telling her in advance. Ben appeared again in 2020, having spent a lot of time out of the service.

First appearance: January 22, 2007

Claudia Aaron Hill's girlfriend from Texas. She is deaf, but learned lip reading to communicate with people. When Aaron first announced to Luann about his relationship with Claudia, Luann accused him of making her up just to make her jealous, until he introduced Claudia to her while her mother was on a business trip. While she remained friends with Luann, she grew fed up with Aaron's flirting with Tiffany, seeing his actions as untrustworthy. After a year-long relationship, she left Aaron and never returned.

First appearance: March 24, 2001

Last appearance: December 11, 2001

Other friends, relatives and neighbors

Knute The upbeat, skateboarding, class clown and Gunther's best friend. Knute and Gunther often team up to create a working magic show, but often with unsuccessful results. He and Crystal have shared feelings for each other but never showed much more than that, finding they are the exact opposite of each other in every way. However, in early February 2011, they did go on a date to a Laurel and Hardy film festival.

First appearance: September 15, 1986.

Last appearance: February 25, 2018.

T.J. (also called TJ) Brad's best friend, who comes up with outrageous schemes, and when they fail, manages to leave Brad holding the bag. He is, however, a very gifted gourmet chef, and a skilled builder. T.J. has disclosed that his mother is deceased, and that his father had been in prison for three years, but had set up a bank account for T.J. before moving to Argentina. Although he and Brad have moved back into the rental home since it has been repaired, he has formed bonds with the DeGroot family.

First mentioned: September 20, 1993

First appearance: September 27, 1993

Rosa Aragones A relatively new girl at Pitts High School when she was first shown. She was born in Washington, D.C., and raised in Italy, France, and Mexico, and can speak English as well as French, Italian, and Spanish, leading Luann to wonder why she's in school. Later that year, she is assisted with her books by Gunther, sparking jealousy in Luann until she learns that Rosa hurt her arm carrying her sister into her wheelchair. She appears again in the Pageant storyline of March/April 2011. Later, she and Gunther grow closer, and their developing relationship is encouraged by Luann as she tries to decide how to proceed in her relationship with Quill. While Rosa is open about her attraction to him, Gunther tends to be awkward and bumbling around her, wanting to please her. They eventually began dating, and upon graduating from high school, they travel to Peru to assist at her uncle's clinic. However, Gunther becomes disillusioned with Peru, and returns to the U.S. with the encouragement of Rosa, who remains.

First appearance: September 5, 2006

Last appearance: January 12, 2015

Mrs. Horner An elderly woman whom Luann visits from time to time and who frequently gives her candid advice. In March 2006 she moved out of her old home and into a new retirement center, but needed the help of Luann, who asked Bernice, Brad, and Toni to help her move out.  Dirk followed Toni to the home, and to impress and be near Toni, helped the moving job finish faster; however, when he picked up Mrs. Horner's clock, an envelope full of money fell out, which Dirk pocketed, intending to steal it. He was caught by Brad, he claimed it to be his, but when Brad swiped it at the perfect time to return to Mrs. Horner, Dirk turned his story around and claimed to have found the envelope in the clock and intended to return it to her. He would have been kicked out had Mrs. Horner did not believe his lie. She later sold her old home to Nancy and Frank, who began renting to Brad. She has made occasional appearances in the strip since then.

First appearance: July 16, 2001

Eddie Munter The new manager of Borderline Books, who replaced Ann Eiffel after she was unwillingly transferred. While Munter is normally very humorous and goodhearted, often ending his comments or jokes with "Kidding!", he knows when to be tough and decisive with his employees, earning the respect of Bernice and Zane shortly after he took over.

First appearance: July 9, 2002

Shannon Daytona (Lewis?) Toni's bratty, blunt and disrespectful six-year-old niece. Her mother left soon after her birth, leaving her with her father, Jonah Daytona. Possibly due to her father ignoring his responsibilities and leaving her with Toni a great deal of the time, Shannon gets what she wants through demanding, whining or throwing temper tantrums. Toni's continuous babysitting has unfortunately reduced the amount of time Brad and Toni have to see each other. Shannon seems to have a strong liking for Brad, whom she's renamed "Bwad", although the feeling is not exactly mutual. Shannon first appeared in 1996, when Luann was asked to sit for the 3-year old in addition to her cousin, Lindy Lewis, but quit due to Shannon's bad behavior. She later reappeared in the strip as Toni's 5-year old cousin in 2008, but in June 2010 it was established that she was actually Toni's niece. While Greg Evans doesn't explicitly state that the 1996 Shannon and the 2008 Shannon are one and the same character, he notes in his blog that while Shannon Daytona is not Shannon Lewis, Luann did indeed babysit her, and that they both recognized each other. As the earlier Shannon's last name was never disclosed, and since Jonah Daytona was never married to Shannon's mother, this may imply that she was never Shannon Lewis in the first place. Toni once referred to Shannon as "Mini Eiffel" due to her similar appearance and personality.

First appearance: January 8, 1996

Jonah Daytona Toni's brother and Shannon's father. He first appeared alongside Toni at a car show where Brad had initially mistaken him for Toni's boyfriend.  Seen as flaky and irresponsible by the rest of the characters, his desired acting career causes him to constantly leave Shannon with his sister so he can rush off to auditions. This tends to get in the way of both her job and her relationship with her boyfriend, Brad, but lately they have become a bit more willing to take care of Shannon (partly due to their low opinion of Jonah's parenting).  He had a role in the play "Les Miserables", and hoped this would lead to his becoming rich and famous, but it did not, and he continues to seek work.  Judging from the collective opinion of Brad, Toni, Quill, and Luann, his acting skill left much to be desired.  In the August 16 to 18, 2016 strips, Toni was able to confront Jonah of being irresponsible of taking care of Shannon, but he managed to twist things around and blame Toni, causing her to reluctantly look after Shannon once more.

First appearance: June 12, 2003

Oxford Oxford, called Ox for short, is a big student who first appeared when Leslie was about to hurt Gunther. He breaks up the scuffle by telling Leslie that if he beat up Gunther, he would do the same to Leslie, causing him to leave. Gunther later thanks him for standing up for his safety; it is revealed that Ox doesn't like bullying or bullies in general and that some people mistake him for one (due to his height and brawny physique). Ox is very kind and likes to help others in need. It is hinted that Ox has rich parents, as they gave him a platinum credit card to pay for his lunches (which tend to be large). He becomes friends with Gunther and eventually T.J. in the May 9, 2012, strip, when he starts eating at Weenie World. In the May 17, 2012, strip, during which Ann Eiffel plans to sue Toni and her niece, Shannon (the latter having bit her finger in an April 2012 strip), Ox returns and upon learning of the event and Ann's cruel way of forcing him to sign a paper to file lawsuit, he refuses and sees Ann as another bully. In the May 22, 2012, strip, Ox takes her paper to show it to his uncle: a lawyer. Ox later agrees not to tell on her so long as she gives up trying to sue Toni; in the final strip of the week, Ann offers Ox a job, impressed by his integrity, but Ox refuses, as he is convinced that Ann simply isn't nice. Ox now works as a server at the DeGroots' restaurant.

First appearance: March 2, 2012

Desdemona Desdemona, always referred to as Dez, is Bernice's roommate at Moony Uni. Dez was unseen for the entirety of Bernice's first semester, always coming and going when Bernice was gone or asleep. Her friends, however, were often imposing on Bernice, dropping stuff off or throwing impromptu parties. She finally introduces herself to Bernice on February 23, 2015. Dez is very spiritual and worldly and decorates the dorm room with souvenirs from her travels.

First mentioned: August 18, 2014

First appearance: February 23, 2015

Prudence Prudence (aka Pru) is a friend of Quill's. She is from New York, and currently staying with the Degroots. During his time in New York as an intern in a theater program, Quill was partnered with a fellow intern, Prudence. Quill had told the others that Prudence was coming from New York to direct a Holiday Show that she wrote, which they could use for opening night of The Fuse. Initially, Luann was jealous of Quill's and Pru's relationship, despite Quill insisting that they were friends, and Bernice was wary of her, thinking that Pru was interested in stealing Quill from Luann. However, when Bernice and Prudence were comforting Luann, it was revealed that Prudence is, as she puts it, "a lesbian thespian!" Prudence is very energetic and friendly towards everyone. Prudence has some things in common with Luann, as they both love the arts, and they both practiced what they were going to say before meeting each other. Pru worked at the DeGroots' event space/restaurant and living in Brad's old bedroom. In March 2020 she announced she was moving back to New York City and marrying a pilot.

First mentioned: July 27, 2015

First appearance: November 19, 2015

Last appearance: April 6, 2020

Jack and Nil Two male students who attended the same college art class with Luann. Jack is seen as an upbeat, yet not very bright person, whereas Nil shows no emotion and makes sardonic remarks about everything. While the professor and Luann initially referred to them as "Jock" and "Goth", their real names remained unknown until the November 3, 2016, strip. Jack likes dogs and can be seen taking his pet dog to the dog park, where Luann spends time with Puddles. Bernice became infatuated with Jack after meeting him until she went on to have a relationship with Nil; this continued until she felt that she was uncontrollable with her intimacy for the latter. They subsequently remain as friends and she serves as a "muse" for his artwork. It was implied afterward that Nil might be bisexual, or rather asexual, after he casually mentioned to Bernice about a random person named Fred who had been asking him out for months.

First appearance: January 26, 2015

Tara Starr Kicked out of Moony Uni for stealing a dorm TV and breaking into a vending machine on Bernice's floor, Tara showed up the next fall as Luann's chemistry lab partner at the junior college. She's uninhibited, free-wheeling, and a little wild, but she recognizes the mistakes she made at Moony and intends to buckle down at the Junior College. However, she soon begins rebelling again when she signs up for a class where Luann is the TA, thinking Luann will give her special treatment. She later decides to move to Utah in order to escape her criminal cousin, but ultimately changed her mind once the cousin was arrested. She ended up getting Luann into trouble at work by bringing a bow and arrow into an elementary school classroom (Luann was doing an after-school program and allowed Tara to meet her students without clearing it with the school administration). In late February 2023, it was revealed that she and Piro are cousins and that they have family issues.

First mentioned (as a "suspect"): April 25, 2017

First mentioned by name: August 26, 2017

First appearance: August 28, 2017

Bets A cosplay enthusiast and current girlfriend of Gunther. While she is eager and creative, she is also very self-centered and focused on her social media following. This leaves her oblivious to how her actions can sometimes affect other people, such as pressuring Gunther into featuring on her social media despite his reluctance, and steamrolling over Tiffany's fancy dinner party business with her own ideas.

First mentioned: February 2, 2019

First appearance: April 1, 2019

Antagonists
Tiffany Farrell Tiffany is Luann's nemesis, a physically attractive, but shallow and arrogant cheerleader in school who constantly insults and belittles Luann. Her best friend is Crystal. It is hinted that Luann and Tiffany might have been friends in elementary school, but their relationship changed once they got to Junior High. Luann and Tiffany often battle for the attentions of various boys, with Luann almost always coming out on top. In March 2003, Luann and Tiffany form a brief friendship after winning a volleyball game as a team, but it falls apart due to their ongoing rivalry over Aaron. Tiffany uses her cell phone camera to take a picture of Luann changing in the girls locker room, initially, trying to blackmail Luann. When Luann fails to cooperate, Tiffany posts the photo on the internet, embarrassing Luann. With Gunther's help, Luann causes Tiffany to be suspended. In January 2008, her title of Miss Chamber of Commerce is revoked due to her role in T.J.'s catering scheme to sell meals in fire stations. In January 2009, she helps Luann fund Delta's accompanying them to Washington, DC; Tiffany's help is short-lived, however. In 2011, she stages a school beauty pageant, the proceeds of which help pay for new bathroom mirrors. Despite liking attractive boys, Tiffany tells Crystal that she never had an actual boyfriend. However, in 2015, she develops a physical attraction to Gunther, her "study buddy." By 2017, Tiffany is struggling with weight gain, brought on by depression. Meanwhile, Tiffany and Luann experience something of a truce late in the year.

First mentioned: March 23, 1985.

First appearance: November 10, 1985.

Crystal Tiffany's only friend though not exactly an antagonist. Although Crystal wears abundant cosmetics, her Goth clothing does not follow the trendy fashions Tiffany wears. However, there are hints of lingering affection between them. She has a handicapped brother named Josh, who looked up to Zane as a mentor. She and Bernice formed a rivalry for Zane's affection, similar to the rivalry between Luann and Tiffany. When Zane began mentoring her brother Josh, she developed a crush on him. During this time, she attempted to occupy as much of Zane's free time as possible leaving him none to spend with Bernice, which added to Bernice's insecurity at the time. In an August 16, 2003 strip she is shown with a star tattoo on her back. She hangs out with Knute a lot, neither one caring what the world thinks of them together or individually, though any romance between them remains subtextual at best.

First appearance: July 12, 2000

Last appearance: October 1, 2017, December 31, 2017 (flashback cameo)

Dirk Toni's jealous former boyfriend and Brad's main rival for Toni Daytona's affections. He has been emotionally abusive toward Toni and physically violent to Brad, and displays severe anger problems. A common boast is that he plans to, or will be, attending the police academy, but it has been pointed out that he has a felony conviction which would automatically disqualify him. While he did not originally view Brad as a threat, when Brad offered to give Toni a ride home after class, Dirk chased after them, causing a car crash in which he was injured. Ironically, Brad resuscitated him in time. Since then, Dirk became more possessive of Toni, foreshadowing their eventual break-up. After striking Brad at his Fire Academy Graduation Ceremony, he was arrested, and a restraining order was issued ordering him to stay away from Brad. Following his release from jail, he took a mandatory anger management course, but he has continuously violated the restraining order (since October 2005). Unwilling to accept Toni dumping him, he continuously stalked her and tried to impress her with shallow gimmicks to try to win her back. In the beginning of May 2006, he was sent back to jail because Brad called the police on him for violating his restraining order.

Dirk returned to the strip as a garbage collector on September 6, 2010 but claims to be working that job only until he starts at the police academy. Shortly after doing so, when Nancy fell off a ladder while doing housework, he helped pick her up. Later in the strip's run, his transformation was proven when he coincidentally ran into Toni at the local grocery store — with his new wife and child. He explains that his anger-management courses did wonders for him, and he met his now-wife through them, and now lives an honest life with his new family.

First appearance: June 19, 2003

Last appearance: March 13, 2013

Derek Bernice's first love interest. Derek initially hit on Bernice and asked her to let him store his gym clothes in her locker. Unaware that Derek's interest in her was only to find a safe place to hide his stash of marijuana in her locker, Bernice fell for him instantly. However, when Bernice discovered drugs in Derek's bag while going through her locker, she was about to turn him in until he "seduced" her with a kiss. While giving Bernice a ride home, Derek almost crashed, as he was under the influence. Bernice got out of the car, but not before dumping his stash of drugs into the street. He appeared again for a short time in May 1989 when he declared how much he loved Delta, and he loved Bernice as a 'friend'. Delta was not impressed. Derek has not appeared since.

First appearance: September 28, 1987

Last appearance: May 19, 1989

Ann Eiffel Former manager of Borderline Books and former manager of Weenie World. On numerous occasions her name shown to be a pun on the phrase, "an eyeful".

Eiffel initially hired Bernice as an employee at Borderline. When Bernice began working with Zane, one of the store's supervisors, Eiffel became very jealous of their relationship and even threatened to fire them if they continued seeing each other. Bernice suspected Eiffel wanted to seduce Zane, but she was actually interested in Bernice instead. Eiffel often interrupted Bernice's tasks by making Bernice bring her lattes; this was either to keep her away from Zane or to gratify herself by making Bernice run her personal errands, a maneuver she repeated in later appearances. When she fired Zane, Bernice developed a very rebellious attitude toward her, which led to Eiffel increasing her harassing efforts to intimidate her, until Borderline CEO Jim Hernandez, who knew Zane very well, arranged to transfer Eiffel to the new bookstore in Tokyo, Japan. On July 12, 2011, she resurfaced as the manager of the local Weenie World restaurant, where Brad applied for work after being laid off by the Fire Department. In 2012, T.J. began working at Weenie World to take Ann Eiffel down. She fired him on January 5, 2013 after he made a recording of Eiffel saying she cons people. He made a second recording in the process of being fired that had Eiffel saying that she took credit for all his sales. He saved both recordings despite Eiffel attempting to delete them. Before leaving, Eiffel kissed T.J., who was not impressed. She returned in August 2017 and was revealed as Leslie Knox's mother. Ann also began dating Tiffany's father Tom in January 2018. They were engaged until it was revealed in July 2020 that Ann had tricked Tiffany's father into thinking she was pregnant, at which point Tom broke up with Ann.

First appearance: January 24, 2002

Last appearance: July 18, 2020

Leslie Knox The sleazy and arrogant bully of Pitts High School, and the nephew of Mr. Gray. Leslie Knox (who always demands to be known as "Les") is a potential stalker of Rosa Aragones. Gunther, who witnessed him harassing Rosa, defended her by swinging his backpack around and twice knocked Les down, supposedly by accident. Les attempted to retaliate but Miss Phelps broke up the confrontation. Les then made an offer to Rosa: if she let him kiss her, he would refrain from taking revenge on Gunther. He has also been seen hitting on Tiffany and extorting money from younger students in the hallways. He reappeared in 2016 when his uncle Mr. Gray sought to get him a job at The Fuse. Since starting he has created a charade of charities to earn extra money on the side. Following the wedding of Brad and Toni, he talked The Fuse employees into doing a gift exchange, as a means of making his move on fellow employee, Prudence, unaware that she is actually a lesbian. When he does learn this fact however, in a surprising show of depth, he accepts it without much fuss, and appears to remain friends with her.

While it has not actually been confirmed, comments by high school counselor Mrs. Phelps about him being the "lowest achiever" and his absence from the 2014 high school graduation imply that he failed to graduate from high school, an indication of his uncle's insistence on remaining employed with the Fuse. Also, his uncle has implied he owes court fines/fees. It has been revealed that his mother is Ann Eiffel, and that they have had a falling out in the past. On October 14, 2017 it was revealed that Leslie's court fines/fees stem from his running up his mother's $5,000 credit card and Ann successfully suing for restitution. 

First appearance: January 28, 2012

School and faculty

Mr. Fogarty The school history teacher. He secretly loves Miss Phelps. Mr. Fogarty's character was created before Luann.  His character starred in Fogarty, which was distributed free of charge to several high school newspapers in the late 1970s and early 1980s. Mr. Fogarty announced that he will retire from teaching at the end of the school year in the May 4, 2014 strip.

First mentioned: May 8, 1985.

First appearance: September 11, 1985.

Last appearance: May 24, 2014.

Miss Margo Phelps The school's incompetent guidance counselor. She had never been married during her tenure at the school, and often compared Luann to her cat while she was having relationship problems. She secretly loves Mr. Fogarty, and marries him sometime after the cast graduates from high school, later going into private practice.

First appearance: April 8, 1985.

Miss Allison The school P.E. teacher. She, like all other fitness teachers, is a strict disciplinarian. Out of all the teachers Luann knows well at Pitts High School, Miss Allison seems to be the only one Luann looks up to as a mentor figure.

First appearance: April 30, 1986 (voice), May 19, 1992 (drawn).

Principal Hightower The principal of Pitts High School. Usually his face is never seen, only his hands when they are placed on his desk.  His face may have been seen in a flashback as Luann's elementary school principal in the October 9, 2002 and October 10, 2002, comics, but it is unknown whether this is the same Principal Hightower, or perhaps a relative or someone with the same last name.

Emergency medical services

Captain The disciplined, strict disciplinarian and straightforward Firefighter Captain of Fire Station No. 3, and Brad's superior officer. Brad first met him when he began the physical exam for Fire Academy. He has assigned Brad and Toni to take Reddy to local schools on more than one occasion, and has assigned Brad to his tasks of his rank as a firefighter. After a firefighters' ball was announced, the Captain was speaking to someone on the phone and saying he planned to take Toni with him. However, he was referring to taking his friend, Tony Gale; which is somewhat ambiguous, as (in the next strip) Brad remarks, "So the captain's..."  – "not asking me," Toni interrupts. Whether Tony is a male or female is left to the reader's imagination, apparently.

In a recent 2011 storyline, due to budget cuts, the Captain had to let one firefighter go, and because Brad was the most recent hired firefighter, the Captain, very regretfully, had to let him go, until the departure of another firefighter resulted in an opening.

First appearance: June 7, 2004

EMT Supervisor Brad's supervisor during his six months of EMT service before taking his Paramedics class. As gracious as he was about Brad fearlessly saving Zane from dying in the fires of the Borderline Bookstore, he had to file a reprimand on Brad's record for violating safety rules, acting outside his training scope, and not wearing proper safety gear. Like the Fire Station Captain, his name is not given.

First appearance: August 3, 2002

Animals

Puddles Luann's dog, so named for his tendency to wee in the wrong spots.

First appearance: December 26, 1985.

Monroe Zane's dog and special canine companion. He is a Golden Retriever and has grown to be a very faithful companion for Zane.

Reddy The Fire Station Mascot. He is a small, 3-foot, Fire Truck, with a remote controller and a built in speaker connected to a microphone and head set, to appear as though he is speaking with his partner. Brad and Toni have brought him to local elementary schools on more than one occasion to demonstrate the importance of fire safety. Brad provides the voice for Reddy and uses Reddy as a means to flirt with Toni. Brad has also used Reddy as a means to speak more openly with Toni. When Brad turned in Dirk and was arguing with Toni about it, he expressed his frustration through Reddy leading to an embarrassing encounter during a school presentation. Afterward, he told the Captain he no longer wants to perform as Reddy to create space between him and Toni.

First appearance: June 6, 2005

Cuddles Luann's cat, an addition to the strip (the storyline has Frank DeGroot being allergic to cats; thus, Luann must keep the two separated). Luann gave Cuddles to Mrs. Horner, to spare her father from his allergies. While Puddles showed some hatred towards Cuddles mainly over territory and attention from Luann matters, he also showed some love as they have cuddled and slept together a few times. Cuddles' original name was Sassy, until Mrs. Horner found a better name as Cuddles.

First appearance: November 1, 2005

Punk Les Knox's cat.

Celebrity cameos
Clay Aiken, Jay Leno and Ben Affleck, Hugh Hefner, Barack Obama, Luke Perry, Bill Gates and Ricky Martin.

Topics
The strip has attained a degree of notoriety for its mixing of real-life topics with the lightness of being a teen in high school. Evans has sprinkled in such topics as Luann's concerns about her first menstruation, Dirk's jealousy (which has led to emotional abuse of Toni and physical violence toward Brad), birth control, drunk driving, handicaps, and other social/policy issues that are of interest to young people. Evans drew praise and some criticism in 1998 for a series of strips about Delta contracting Hodgkin lymphoma. Following the attacks of September 11, 2001, the character of Brad was inspired by the actions of the FDNY to become a firefighter, and there have been extended storylines following him. On November 14, 2001, the satirical newspaper The Onion ran a story supposedly detailing Evans' struggle to address the events of 9/11 in his strip.

Aging of the characters
From 1985 to 1999, Luann was vaguely in the eighth grade. According to Evans' blog, Luann was 13 in 1999. This younger era of Luann focused on topics among children in junior high school and within Luann's family at home. Since 1999 Luann has been slowly aging from 15 to 16 years old at perhaps the rate of one Luann month per one reader year, though this opposes what Evans has said on his blog. In the fall of 2013, it was made clear that Luann and her peers were seniors in high school, suggesting that the characters are around 17 years old and preparing for college. In June, 2014, Greg and Karen Evans ran a story arc in which the high school characters attended their graduation. Luann is attending college as of September 3, 2014. On September 28, 2014, Greg Evans and his daughter Karen made an appearance in the strip, wishing Luann a happy 18th birthday.

Luann Againn
On March 17, 2013, GoComics began republishing old strips under the title Luann Againn, starting with the first strip, dated March 17, 1985.

Musical
In 2006, Evans—with the help of arranger/orchestrator Justin Gray—wrote a musical based on the strip, titled Luann: Scenes in a Teen's Life, produced by Center ARTES and performed at the California Center for the Arts in Escondido, California. It was performed by local drama students from Rancho Buena Vista High School. An original cast recording, titled Scenes in a Teen's Life, was made. In March 2008, Palomar College, in San Marcos, California performed this musical. It was the musical's college theater debut. Luann: Scenes In A Teen's Life was next scheduled to be performed by Huntington Beach Playhouse in August 2008.  Its South San Diego High School debut was in May 2010.

Books
There are 22 books featuring Luann:

Footnotes

External links
 

1985 comics debuts
American comics characters
American comic strips
Child characters in comics
Comics about women
Comics adapted into plays
Comics characters introduced in 1985
Female characters in comics
Gag-a-day comics
Musicals based on comic strips
Teen comedy comics